Anna George de Mille (1878–1947) was an American feminist and Georgism advocate. She was the mother of Agnes George de Mille.

Biography 
Anna de Mille was born in San Francisco in 1878 to Henry George and Annie Corsina Fox George. Throughout her life, she served as a prominent leader of the single-tax movement, in many leadership roles including vice president of the International Union for Land Value Taxation and Free Trade in London, and a director of the Robert Schalkenbach Foundation. In 1932 she partnered with Oscar H. Geiger to establish the Henry George School of Social Science. She served as the president of the board of trustees of said school. De Mille went on several tours promoting the single-tax movement, and was a large donor to the Henry George Collection at the New York Public Library. She served as an officer in the Henry George Foundation of Pittsburgh.

In 1950, she published Henry George, Citizen of the World, a biography of her father, which was published by the University of North Carolina Press after being released in The American Journal of Economics and Sociology. De Mille also helped raise money for the restoration of Henry George's birthplace.

References 

1878 births
1947 deaths
Georgists